Beverly Hills Chihuahua 3: Viva la Fiesta! is a 2012 American comedy film directed by Lev L. Spiro. It is the third and final installment of the Beverly Hills Chihuahua series, and stars George Lopez, Odette Annable and Logan Grove. The film focuses on Papi, Chloe and the puppies moving to a hotel. Pedro finds love when he falls head over heels for Charlotte.

The film was released by Walt Disney Studios Home Entertainment on September 18, 2012 in a two-disc Blu-ray/DVD combo pack. Zachary Gordon and Chantily Spalan did not reprise their roles as Papi, Jr. and Rosa. This was Kay Panabaker's final film before her retirement to study zoology and become an animal keeper at Disney's Animal Kingdom.

Plot
After their wedding, Rachel and Sam decide to find new jobs. The Langham Hotel is willing to let anybody who can take the place of the landscaper and chef live in the hotel. Sam and Rachel bring Chloe and Papi to the hotel, where Chloe and Papi meet Oscar and Jenny, the hotel's Doggy Day School teachers. Papi is less than thrilled when he discovers he will no longer be teaching the pups. Mr. Hollis, the manager, notices Chloe and asks if she can make appearances as the hotel has gained a major threat, Montague, the owner of a new hotel rivaling the Langham. Because of this Sam and Rachel get the jobs. Rosa is also not much happier at the thought of Doggy Day School. Pedro also comes along to the Langham decked out in sunnies. The humans, chihuahuas and Pedro are blown away at their room's luxury. However Rosa isn't feeling happy and is nervous about day school. Papi comforts her, telling her about how he was a chamberlain at a friend's Quinceanera when Pedro finds a picture in a box marked "DO NOT OPEN". Papi tells her what a Quinceanera is about. Later, Chloe, Sam and Rachel start work and the puppies go to school.

Rachel meets her boss, Chef Didier, an uptight man who is very fond of himself. When somebody quits, Chef says that he fired him. When he and Rachel meet, he tells her to wash dishes and then throws herbs at her face. Sam meets his assistant, Lester, who is lazy and tired and leaves Sam to do all the work. Rosa is being bullied by a large dog who teases her for having to wear swimmies. Rosa runs off, upset and embarrassed and the puppies get payback on the dog. Papi finds Sam and offers assistance, but just as he begins to help, he hears a rustling sound and finds an overgrown and messy garden. There, he meets Arnie, a stray dog. Oscar then arrives as Jenny quickly leaves, not wanting to be seen or heard. Papi is concerned for the pups' safety and asks Oscar what is going on. Oscar, however, doesn't want to mention anything and leaves Papi to ponder what is going on. Arnie makes a carving of Jenny to warn Papi, but Papi doesn't understand it.

Back at home, Rosa fakes being sick to avoid going to school but when Papi says she will have to go to the vet, she claims she is feeling better. She claims that she does not want to be little anymore and states she wants to be a Quince. When the other pups assume it is "One of dad's weird Mexican holidays", they state they want a sweet sixteen, but Rosa says she wants a Quince and Papi promises to throw her one.
The next day, an old friend, Sebastian, arrives and helps with the party planning. But in the midst of the party planning, Papi continues to be his paranoid self and was pressured due to the lot of errands he has been working on. As more proof of Jenny and Oscar scheming something behind their backs, and Rosa saving a dog, Charlotte, who was a VIP guest at the hotel, they contact Delgado, to help with their plan on catching Jenny and preparing Rosa's quince.

The next day, Papi, Pedro and Arnie are together, with Pedro keeping watch. Jenny appears, telling Oscar to be quiet. She trips and falls into a pit of peanut butter, and Pedro calls more dogs. When Hollis overhears the commotion, Pedro opens the gate, and Delgado appears with Montague, the competitor hotel manager, hung upside down. A bewildered Chloe comes and apologizes to Papi. After a while, Chloe and Papi wake up Rosa with quince outfits for her and her siblings and get ready. As the quince starts, Ali reveals that she was the one who mentioned Charlotte's rescue to the other pups. Jenny and Oscar are arrested, Papi becomes the new teacher at the doggy day care, and Hollis adopts Arnie.

Cast 
 Marcus Coloma as Sam Cortez
 Erin Cahill as Rachel Ashe Cortez
 Cedric Yarbrough as Hollis
 Frances Fisher as Amelia James
 Briana Lane as Jenny
 Sebastian Roche as Chef Frank Didier
 Jason Brooks as Mr. Montague
 Kyle Gass as Lester
 Amanda Fuller as Spa Employee
 Michael Lanahan as BellHop #1
 Sam Pancake as Frederick
 Eddie "Piolin" Sotelo as Hotel Security Guard
 Jeff Witzke as Cook
 Dana Rutkin as Assistant Cook 
 Caren Boyajian as Bellhop #2
 J. P. Manoux as Gustavo
 Cara Santana as Jillian

Voices
 George Lopez as Papi
 Odette Annable as Chloe 
 Ernie Hudson as Pedro
 Kay Panabaker as Rosa; Panabaker replaced Chantilly Spalan as the voice of Rosa.
 Logan Grove as Papi Jr.; Grove replaced Zachary Gordon as the voice of Papi Jr.
 Emily Osment as Pep
 Madison Pettis as Lala
 Delaney Jones as Ali
 Tom Kenny as Sebastian
 Jake Busey as Oscar
 Lacey Chabert as Charlotte
 Miguel Ferrer as Delgado
 Phil LaMarr as Diego and Black Labbeth Bassist
 Eddie "Piolín" Sotelo as Humberto
 Nick Eversman as Phil
 Lev L. Spiro as Black Labbeth Guitarist

References

External links
 
 
 
 

2012 direct-to-video films
2012 films
2010s English-language films
2010s children's comedy films
American children's comedy films
Direct-to-video sequel films
Disney direct-to-video films
Films about animals
Films about dogs
Films about pets
Films scored by Heitor Pereira
2012 comedy films
Films set in hotels
Beverly Hills Chihuahua (film series)
Films directed by Lev L. Spiro
Films produced by David Hoberman
2010s American films